Mulli Urqu (Quechua mulli Peruvian pepper tree, urqu mountain, "Peruvian pepper tree mountain",  also spelled Molle Orkho) is a  mountain in the Bolivian Andes. It is located in the Chuquisaca Department, Oropeza Province, Yotala Municipality. Mulli Urqu lies west of the Kachi Mayu which is a left tributary of the Pillku Mayu (Quechua for "red river").

References 

Mountains of Chuquisaca Department